If This Is All We're Going to Be is the third studio album by Australian rock band Luca Brasi, released on 29 April 2016 by Poison City Records. It was produced by Jimmy Balderston and recorded at Red Planet in Hobart between November 2015 and April 2016.

Background and promotion
If This Is All We're Going to Be was written over the couple of years between their last release. Their first single "Aeroplane" was released in November 2015 as a limited promo-single, it was later released digitally. The band released their second single "The Cascade Blues" on 9 February 2016. The band released their third single "Count Me Out" on 30 December containing guest vocals from Georgia McDonald of Camp Cope.

The album was released to Luca Brasi's BandCamp on 29 April where all proceeds were donated to Minus18, Australia's largest youth-led network for the LGBT community.

Critical reception

The album received positive reviews from sources. AAA Backstage praised the album saying, "The new progression is pleasant, refreshing, and shows that the Luca Brasi train is not close to slowing down." The AU Review gave the album a positive review and said it was "another fitting chapter in what’s becoming a fascinating and brilliant musical career." Alex Sievers from KillYourStereo rated the album 80/100 and said: "Despite their repetitive sound, Luca Brasi is living and breathing proof that bands from Tasmania can outshine those from the glorious mainland." The Brag gave the album a positive review and said: "Luca Brasi have come through with one of the better Australian punk albums of the year." In a positive review, Spotlight Report wrote, "Luca Brasi have clearly worked hard from their first two albums to settle into themselves, yet still push their abilities as musicians." The track "Anything Near Conviction" was voted into the Triple J Hottest 100, 2016, at No. 90.

Track listing
Track listing adapted from AllMusic.

Personnel
Luca Brasi
 Tyler Richardson – lead vocals, bass
 Thomas Busby – lead guitar, backing vocals
 Patrick Marshall – rhythm guitar, vocals
 Danny Flood – drums

Additional musicians
 Georgia McDonald – guest vocals on track 10
 Tom Lanyon - guest vocals on track 7

Production
 Jimmy Balderston – producer
 Brian McTernan – mixing

Charts

Release history

References

2016 albums
Luca Brasi (band) albums